The 2016 F4 British Championship (known as 2016 MSA Formula Championship at the first two rounds) was a multi-event, Formula 4 open-wheel single seater motor racing championship held across England and Scotland. The championship featured a mix of professional motor racing teams and privately funded drivers, competing in Formula 4 cars that conformed to the technical regulations for the championship. This, the second season, following on from the British Formula Ford Championship, was the second year that the cars conformed to the FIA's Formula 4 regulations. Part of the TOCA tour, it formed part of the extensive program of support categories built up around the BTCC centrepiece.

The season commenced on 2 April at Brands Hatch – on the circuit's Indy configuration – and concluded on 1 October at the same venue, utilising the Grand Prix circuit, after thirty races at ten meetings, all in support of the 2016 British Touring Car Championship season.

Teams and drivers
All teams were British-registered.

Race calendar and results
The calendar for the 2016 TOCA package was announced on 27 July 2015.

Championship standings

Points were awarded as follows:

Drivers' standings

Rookie Cup

Teams Cup

References

External links
 

F4 British Championship seasons
British F4
F4 British Championship
British F4